"Special to Me" is the 26th single by Japanese idol duo Wink. A Japanese-language cover of Bobby Caldwell's 1978 song, it was originally recorded in 1989 as part of the album Twin Memories. "Special to Me" was released as a 7" vinyl single by Polystar Records on April 27, 2018, to commemorate the duo's 30th anniversary. The B-side is a remix of Wink's sixth single "One Night in Heaven (Mayonaka no Angel)".

The single peaked at No. 196 on the Oricon's weekly charts.

Track listing 
All music is arranged by Motoki Funayama.

Chart positions

References

External links 
 
 

1989 songs
2018 singles
Wink (duo) songs
Japanese-language songs
Songs written by Bobby Caldwell
Songs with lyrics by Neko Oikawa